Sugar Fields is a 2016 Dominican adventure historical drama film directed by Fernando Baez Mella. It was selected as the Dominican entry for the Best Foreign Language Film at the 89th Academy Awards but it was not nominated.

Cast
 Héctor Aníbal as Samuel

See also
 List of submissions to the 89th Academy Awards for Best Foreign Language Film
 List of Dominican submissions for the Academy Award for Best Foreign Language Film

References

External links
 

2016 films
2016 drama films
Dominican Republic drama films

Dominican Republic adventure films
Dominican Republic historical films
Dominican Republic historical drama films
2010s Spanish-language films